Żelazki may refer to the following places:
Żelazki, Podlaskie Voivodeship (north-east Poland)
Żelazki, Warmian-Masurian Voivodeship (north Poland)
Żelazki, Gołdap County in Warmian-Masurian Voivodeship (north Poland)